British Bangladeshi Who's Who is an annual publication highlighting the accomplishments, contributions and achievements of successful British Bangladeshis. It was established in 2008 and also holds an annual award ceremony in London, England.

History
British Bangladeshis Who's Who celebrates individuals from various sectors who are at the top of their respective arena. It is designed to highlight and emphasise distinguished figures in the Bangladeshi community in Britain and continually recognise the success and significance of the Bangladeshi community.

It focuses on British Bangladeshi's support for the economy and highlights individual accomplishment, contributions and achievements of successful, influential and wealthy members of the Bangladeshi community from various sectors and professions. It lists over 200 profiles of British Bangladeshis, including medics, journalists, lawyers, businessmen, accountants and others from various walks of life. A number are picked out to receive awards for their exceptional work.

Since 2008, the British Bangla Media Group and the Bangla Mirror Group have been publishing the British Bangladeshi Who's Who. The publication and event was the idea of Mohammed Abdul Karim and his son Shahadoth Karim  who are the editor in chief and editor.

Past events
In October 2010, the third edition of British Bangladeshi Who's Who included profiles of 200 successful personalities. 400 guests attended the dinner. In October 2011, the annual gala dinner launching the publication took place at Water Lily in East London. In October 2012, the award ceremony and gala dinner was held at the Panorama Hall of Alexandra Palace in North London. In October 2013, the award ceremony and gala dinner was held again at the Panorama Hall of Alexandra Palace. In November 2014, the publication, award ceremony and gala dinner was held for the third consecutive year in the Panorama Hall of Alexandra Palace. In October 2015, a press conference was held at the London Muslim Centre, to announce the launch of the 2015 publication. In November 2015, the publication and gala event was held at Meridian Grand in North London. In November 2016, the publication and gala event was held at Meridian Grand in North London.

Outstanding Contribution Award

See also
British Bangladeshi Power 100
List of British Bangladeshis
Who's Who

References

External links

2008 edition
2009 edition
2010 edition

2011 edition
2012 edition
2013 edition
2014 edition
2015 edition
2016 edition

2008 establishments in the United Kingdom
2008 non-fiction books
English non-fiction books
English-language books
British biographical dictionaries
Top people lists
British awards
Lists of British people
Annual events in London
Bangladeshi diaspora in the United Kingdom